Constantine II may refer to:

 Constantine II (emperor) (317–340), Roman Emperor 337–340
 Constantine III (usurper) (died 411), known as Constantine II of Britain in British legend
 Constantine II of Byzantine (630–668)
 Antipope Constantine II (died 768), antipope from 767 to 768
 Constantine II of Scotland (c.878 – 952), King of Scotland 900–942 or 943
 Constantine II, Prince of Armenia (died 1129)
 Constantine II of Cagliari (c. 1100 – 1163)
 Constantine II of Torres (died 1198), called de Martis, was the giudice of Logudoro
 Constantine II the Woolmaker (died 1322), Catholicos of the Armenian Apostolic Church
 Constantine II, King of Armenia (died 1344), first Latin King of Armenian Cilicia of the Lusignan dynasty
 Constantine II of Bulgaria (early 1370s–1422), last emperor of Bulgaria 1396–1422.
 Eskender (1471–1494), Emperor of Ethiopia sometimes known as Constantine II
 Constantine II of Georgia (c. 1447 – 1505)
 Constantine II, Prince of Mukhrani (died 1716), Georgian nobleman
 Constantine II of Kakheti (died 1732), King of Kakheti 1722–1732
 Constantine II of Greece (1940–2023), Olympic champion (1960) and formerly King of the Hellenes March 6, 1964 – June 1, 1973

See also 
 Constantius II (317–361), Roman Emperor from 337 to 361